Mazimbu Graves in Morogoro Region, Tanzania is a cemetery for deceased South African anti-apartheid activists who died in exile.

References 

Cemeteries in Tanzania
Buildings and structures in the Morogoro Region